is a retired Japanese gymnast. She competed in all artistic gymnastics events at the 1964 Olympics and won a team bronze medal. Her best individual achievement was 23rd place on the vault.

References

External links
 
 

1938 births
Living people
Japanese female artistic gymnasts
Olympic gymnasts of Japan
Gymnasts at the 1964 Summer Olympics
Olympic bronze medalists for Japan
Olympic medalists in gymnastics
Medalists at the 1964 Summer Olympics
Medalists at the World Artistic Gymnastics Championships
20th-century Japanese women